The men's 110 metres hurdles at the 1980 Summer Olympics in Moscow, Soviet Union had an entry list of 23 competitors from 16 nations, with three qualifying heats (23 runners) and two semifinals (16) before the final (8) took place on Sunday 27 July 1980. The maximum number of athletes per nation had been set at 3 since the 1930 Olympic Congress. The event was won by Thomas Munkelt of East Germany, the first medal by a German runner in the event. Alejandro Casañas of Cuba took silver for the second Games in a row, making him the eighth man with two medals in the event. Aleksandr Puchkov's bronze was the Soviet Union's second medal in the event and first since 1964.

Background

This was the 19th appearance of the event, which is one of 12 athletics events to have been held at every Summer Olympics. Two finalists from 1976 returned: silver medalist Alejandro Casañas of Cuba and fifth-place finisher Thomas Munkelt of East Germany. While 1976 had been an off year for American hurdles, the United States had two dominant athletes in 1980: Renaldo Nehemiah and Greg Foster. The American-led boycott of the 1980 Games, however, prevented both from competing. In their absence, Casañas and Munkelt were favored.

Bulgaria, the Republic of the Congo, Mozambique, the Seychelles, and Syria each made their first appearance in the event. Great Britain made its 17th appearance (having missed 1900 and 1904), most of any nation competing in 1980 but still one behind the absent United States's 18.

Competition format

The competition continued to use the three-round format used since 1908 (except 1960, which had four rounds) and eight-man semifinals and finals, as well as the "fastest loser" system, used since 1964. The first round consisted of three heats, with 7 or 8 hurdlers each. The top five hurdlers in each heat, along with the next fastest overall, advanced to the semifinals. The 16 semifinalists were divided into two semifinals of 8 hurdlers each; the top four hurdlers in each advanced to the 8-man final.

Records

These were the standing world and Olympic records (in seconds) prior to the 1980 Summer Olympics.

No new world or Olympic records were set during the competition.

Schedule

All times are Moscow Time (UTC+3)

Results

Round 1

The first round was held on Friday 25 July 1980.

Heat 1

Heat 2

Heat 3

Semifinals

The semifinals were held on Sunday 27 July 1980.

Semifinal 1

Semifinal 2

Final

Casañas hit the first two hurdles, allowing Munkelt to build a lead; Casañas nearly caught him, but "lost out to Munkelt in a lean at the tape."

See also
 1976 Men's Olympic 110m Hurdles (Montreal)
 1978 Men's European Championships 110m Hurdles (Prague)
 1982 Men's European Championships 110m Hurdles (Athens)
 1983 Men's World Championships 110m Hurdles (Helsinki)
 1984 Men's Olympic 110m Hurdles (Los Angeles)
 1984 Men's Friendship Games 110m Hurdles (Moscow)

References

 1
Sprint hurdles at the Olympics
Men's events at the 1980 Summer Olympics